The Avondale Park Historic District in Birmingham, Alabama is a  historic district that was listed on the National Register of Historic Places in 1998.  It is in the Avondale section of the city. It includes work dating to 1886 and work by Burnhum & Greer.  It includes Queen Anne, Colonial Revival, and Tudor Revival architecture.  The listing included 425 contributing buildings, one contributing site, and two contributing structures.

At least four of the contributing buildings are houses of worship including Avondale United Methodist Church, the Birmingham Baha'i Center, the Birmingham Friends Meeting, and Redeemer Community Church. The Baha'i center and the Friends meetinghouse were originally houses. Redeemer's domed building was built for South Avondale Baptist Church.

Avondale Park 
The district is centered around Avondale Park, a city park that has been reserved for green space since the urban development of the neighborhood in 1887. It will be the venue for archery during the 2022 World Games.

References

National Register of Historic Places in Birmingham, Alabama
Historic districts in Birmingham, Alabama
Queen Anne architecture in Alabama
Colonial Revival architecture in Alabama
Tudor Revival architecture in Alabama
Historic districts on the National Register of Historic Places in Alabama